Sue Lewis (born 28 December 1954) is an Australian former swimmer. She competed in three events at the 1972 Summer Olympics.

References

External links
 

1954 births
Living people
Australian female backstroke swimmers
Olympic swimmers of Australia
Swimmers at the 1972 Summer Olympics
Place of birth missing (living people)
20th-century Australian women